Nazli Bayat Makou (born 16 September 1945) is an Iranian athlete. She competed in the women's high jump at the 1964 Summer Olympics.

References

1945 births
Living people
Athletes (track and field) at the 1964 Summer Olympics
Iranian female high jumpers
Olympic athletes of Iran
Place of birth missing (living people)